John Moeti (30 August 1967 – 6 February 2023) was a South African former professional footballer who played as a midfielder. He played club football for Orlando Pirates and SuperSport United; he also earned 29 caps for the South Africa national side between 1995 and 1999, scoring one goal. He won the CAF Champions League in 1995 when Pirates defeated ASEC Mimosas of Ivory Coast in the final. He was part of the squad that won the 1996 African Cup of Nations.

References

External links

1967 births
2023 deaths
Sportspeople from Soweto
South African soccer players
Association football midfielders
South Africa international soccer players
1996 African Cup of Nations players
1997 FIFA Confederations Cup players
1998 African Cup of Nations players
Orlando Pirates F.C. players
SuperSport United F.C. players